

New Hampshire 

In 1796, New Hampshire had a single at-large district with 4 seats.  Each voter cast 4 votes and a majority of voters (12.5% of votes) was required to be elected.  Since only three candidates received a majority, a run-off was held between the candidates in fourth and fifth place to fill the remaining seat.

See also 
 United States House of Representatives elections, 1796 and 1797
 List of United States representatives from New Hampshire

References 

1796
New Hampshire
United States House of Representatives